The death of Jeanette Bishop and Gabriella Guerin occurred sometime between November 29, 1980, when the two women were last seen in the Italian town of Sarnano,  and January 27, 1982, when their remains were found near Lago di Fiastra in the Sibillini Mountains. How Bishop and Guerin met their deaths, what they were doing between their disappearance and the likely date of their deaths a month later, or even why the two ventured up into the mountains in snowy weather, is unknown. Initially ruled deaths caused by hypothermia, by September 1989, the investigating prosecutor concluded it was a double murder by unknown perpetrators, using unknown means. Over the course of investigations, enquiries expanded to other countries, mostly to the European Union, but also to Brazil and the United Kingdom and encompassed possible connections to art theft, robbery and alleged blackmail plots.

Background 
Ellen Dorothy Jeanette Bishop, was a 40-year old former model, born in London. She was previously known by the surname Rothschild as the former wife of financier Evelyn de Rothschild, and later by May through her second marriage to Stephen Charles May. In November 1980, she was in the Sarnano area to organize renovations on a house she and May had recently purchased in the hamlet of Schito. With her was her longtime friend, assistant and interpreter, the Italian Gabriella Guerin, aged 39. On November 29, Bishop and Guerin drove in their car, a Peugeot 104, heading up the mountain road towards Sassotetto, the highest hamlet of the Sarnano  (municipality). That evening the weather conditions were poor, with a snowstorm that lasted until the next day.

Investigations

Search
The two women failing to return, a search by helicopter from the carabinieri helicopter unit of Ancona was undertaken in December 1980. Some three weeks after their disappearance the aerial search located the car, parked―rather than abandoned—at the roadside near an unoccupied house. Footprints were found around the house and it was thought that Bishop and Guerin had used it as a refuge from the snowstorm. Inside, used dishes and the remains of a fire fueled with wooden furniture were found. The car was in complete working order and there were no signs of any struggle, assault or force.

Remains located
On January 14, 1982, Bishop's husband, Stephen May, offered a reward of  dollars for anyone who found Jeanette alive, but on January 18, 1982, the carabinieri of Camerino, not finding any trace of the two women, hypothesized that they may have died from hypothermia; May did not believe this theory was likely. Only two weeks later, on 27 January, two hunters stumbled upon the personal belongings and largely decomposed bodies of the missing women in a forest, between Lago di Fiastra and the hermitage of San Liberato. The bones had been damaged by wild boars and some of them were missing. The autopsy revealed that both Bishop and Guerin died at the site.

Christie's case
In December 1982, the case was taken by the Macerata prosecutor Alessandro Iacoboni, who investigated the case as a possible murder. At the same time, Scotland Yard was investigating the death of a Roman antique dealer, Sergio Vaccari, who was killed with 15 stab wounds on 17 September 1982 in his apartment in Holland Park. This further complicated the case of the death of the two women, as it emerged that Bishop was one of the man's contacts, and Bishop and Vaccari may have been connected with a theft from auction house Christie's, in Piazza Navona, which occurred the day after the two women were last seen. Telegrams, some incomprehensible and apparently coded, were found in the possession of Bishop; they contained certain correspondences to telegrams which had been sent to Christie's, disclosing details of the theft. On 25 September 1989, Iacoboni concluded that the case was attributable to a double homicide with unknown causes and perpetrators.

Possible Assassination
During the investigation, Bishop's name came up during the investigation of the Institute for Religious Works (IOR; "Vatican Bank's") then-President Paul Marcinkus, and in the Orlandi case. According to the testimony of Marco Fassone Accetti, one of the six people accused of the disappearance of Orlandi, he and his associates planned an operation against the IOR and other religious figures, in an attempt to stop the funding of John Paul II. For this plan, Bishop was one of the women allegedly recruited to accuse Marcinkus of sexual assault. She was purportedly chosen due to her social connections with the influential and highly placed; her death prevented the plan being enacted. Bishop was a friend of Archbishop Marcinkus. This circumstance, together with the evidence of the "super witness" Accetti, has given rise to highly speculative theories, involving some possible discovery of information by Bishop, to Marcinkus' discredit, thus resulting in the need for her to be "silenced".

Later developments
In 2006, the professor of molecular forensic diagnostics Franco Maria Venanzi, of the University of Camerino, managed to carry out the recognition of Gabriella Guerin through the examination of her DNA.

References 

Rothschild family
1982 murders in Italy
1980 murders in Italy